Robyn Ottolini is a Canadian country singer and songwriter. She is currently signed to Warner Music Nashville, and has released four extended plays as well as the platinum-certified single "F-150".

Early life
Robyn Ottolini was raised in Uxbridge, Ontario and began songwriting at the age of 13. She cites Kacey Musgraves, Lennon & Maisy, and Sam Hunt as influences on her music.

Career
In 2016, Ottolini was the second runner-up at the Boots and Hearts Music Festival’s Emerging Artist Showcase.

In February 2019, she independently released her debut EP Classic. She was nominated for the Rising Star Award at the 2019 Country Music Association of Ontario Awards.

In January 2020, Ottolini released the song "F-150". The track was included on her February 2020 release The I'm Not Always Hilarious EP. Towards the latter half of 2020, "F-150" gained traction on TikTok and charted at #3 on the Rolling Stone Trending 25 chart in the United States for the week of October 1, 2020. Amidst the success of the track, she signed a record deal with Warner Music Nashville.

"F-150" impacted country radio formats on February 16, 2021, and became her first Top 10 hit on the Billboard Canada Country chart, and first gold-certified single in Canada. In June 2021, Ottolini released her major-label debut project The But I'm Not Always Sad Either EP, which included the single "Tell You Everything". Later that year, she won the "Rising Star" award at the 2021 Canadian Country Music Awards.

Discography

Extended plays

Singles

Christmas singles

Music videos

Awards and nominations

References

External links

Living people
Canadian women country singers
Canadian country singer-songwriters
Canadian women singer-songwriters
Musicians from Ontario
People from Uxbridge, Ontario
21st-century Canadian women singers
Warner Records artists
1995 births